Siva Ananth is an Indian film producer, writer, lyricist, director and actor who has regularly collaborated with film maker Mani Ratnam. He made his directorial debut with Chukkallo Chandrudu (2006), and has also served in other professions in the film industry.

Career
Siva was born in Sivagangai, Tamil Nadu and did his schooling at O.V.C School (till SSLC), Manamadurai and Ramakrishna Mission (higher secondary), Salem, then enrolling for Industrial Engineering at Birla Institute of Technology and Science (BITS) in Pilani in 1991 and graduating by 1995. He pursued MS in Mass Communications with an ancillary in Film Theory at the University of Florida, US and graduated in 1997 after producing a thesis describing a comparative study of production technique in Hollywood and Indian Cinema. During his time at BITS, he took up script-writing and revealed his fascination with director Mani Ratnam's work in Roja had sparked an initial interest. After submitting his thesis, he contacted Mani Ratnam and secured a position as an assistant director after being asked to write a short story. The short story "Yogi" was also later published by journal, Ananda Vikatan.

He joined Mani Ratnam's team halfway through the shoot of Dil Se.. (1998), and his first day was spent working on the production of the song Chaiyya Chaiyya, and he was also assigned to help oversee the film's sound effects. His first film as an assistant director was Alaipayuthey (2000) and he worked alongside fellow apprentice Shaad Ali, in helping Madras Talkies complete the venture. In 2001, he began his first individual project as a director, Acham Thavir starring Madhavan and Jyothika, and produced by Vikram Singh. Siva worked on the script alongside Selvaraj, with Ranjit Barot and Vinod signed as music composer and cinematographer, respectively. However Singh's financial problems meant that the film was called off 20 days into shoot, despite the team holding a schedule in Syria. Siva subsequently reverted to assisting Mani Ratnam for Aaytha Ezhuthu and Yuva (2004), while also working on directing commercials.

During the making of Acham Thavir, Siva had become acquainted with Siddharth, who had served as an assistant director and the pair subsequently regularly discussed films. After becoming an actor, Siddharth recommended Siva to producer K. S. Rama Rao in 2005, to be the director of a venture that the pair were working on. Subsequently, along with Siddharth and Kona Venkat, Siva helped developed the script for Chukkallo Chandrudu (2006), a Telugu language romantic comedy. The film also featured Siddharth, along with veteran Akkineni Nageswara Rao and three lead actresses, and released in January 2006. Described as a "sophisticated comedy film for multiplex crowds", it opened to mixed reviews and failed at the box office. Siva moved on to assist V. Priya in writing the dialogues for Kannamoochi Yenada (2007), while also working with Mani Ratnam in Guru (2007). In 2010, it was reported that Siva would make a return to directing with a Hindi project titled Bloody Paki featuring Vivek Oberoi and Genelia D'Souza, but the film eventually did not materialise.

In 2015, he appeared in a full-fledged acting role as Dulquer Salmaan's brother in Mani Ratnam's O Kadhal Kanmani. Alongside his commitments as an actor, Siva was also credited to be the head of post-production works and in the soundtrack, as an additional vocalist.

Filmography

References

External links

Living people
Film directors from Tamil Nadu
Telugu film directors
People from Sivaganga district
Tamil screenwriters
Telugu screenwriters
Birla Institute of Technology and Science, Pilani alumni
University of Florida alumni
Screenwriters from Tamil Nadu
1974 births